Gérard Corbiau (born 19 September 1941) is a Belgian film director.

Corbiau was born in Brussels, Belgium. He is best known for his costume dramas about music, Le maître de musique (1987), Farinelli (1994) and Le roi danse (2000). Two of them (Le maître de musique and Farinelli) were nominated for the Academy Award for Best Foreign Language Film. He lives in Belgium and is working on several projects.

References

External links

1941 births
Living people
Belgian film directors